Shallow Lake is a lake located northeast of Inlet, New York. Fish species present in the lake are black bullhead, brook trout, white sucker and smallmouth bass. There is carry down access. No motors are allowed on this lake.

References

Lakes of New York (state)
Lakes of Hamilton County, New York